Charles Green Bush (1842 – May 21, 1909) was an American newspaper cartoonist who has been called the "originator of the daily newspaper cartoon". His work in appeared in New York papers such as the Telegram, Herald,  and the later the World, and was known for its cleverness and simplicity.

Gallery

References

External links 
 Billy Ireland Cartoon Library & Museum Art Database

1842 births
1909 deaths
American editorial cartoonists
Artists from Boston
Artists from New York City
19th-century artists